Joel Baraye (born 5 January 1997) is a Senegalese football player who plays as a defender for Italian  club Padova.

Club career
He made his professional debut in the Serie B for Brescia on 17 May 2014 in a game against Varese.

On 30 January 2018 he joined Carrarese on loan.

On 25 August 2018, he was signed by Catania, in a temporary deal.

On 16 July 2019, he signed by Padova on loan with an obligation to buy.

On 5 October 2020 he joined Salernitana on loan. If certain conditions were met, Salernitana would have held an obligation to purchase his rights at the end of the loan.

On 7 January 2021 he went to Avellino on loan.

On 31 August 2021, he was loaned to Monopoli.

References

External links
 

1997 births
Living people
Footballers from Dakar
Senegalese footballers
Association football defenders
Serie B players
Serie C players
Brescia Calcio players
Virtus Entella players
Carrarese Calcio players
Catania S.S.D. players
Calcio Padova players
U.S. Salernitana 1919 players
U.S. Avellino 1912 players
S.S. Monopoli 1966 players
Senegalese expatriate footballers
Expatriate footballers in Italy
Senegalese expatriate sportspeople in Italy